Guizygiella is a genus of Asian long-jawed orb-weavers that was first described by M. S. Zhu, J. P. Kim & D. X. Song in 1997.

Species
 it contains six species, found in Asia:
Guizygiella guangxiensis (Zhu & Zhang, 1993) – China, Laos
Guizygiella indica (Tikader & Bal, 1980) – India
Guizygiella melanocrania (Thorell, 1887) – India to China, Laos
Guizygiella nadleri (Heimer, 1984) – China, Laos, Vietnam
Guizygiella salta (Yin & Gong, 1996) (type) – China
Guizygiella shivui (Patel & Reddy, 1990) – India

In synonymy:
G. baojingensis (Yin, 2002, T from Zygiella) = Guizygiella salta (Yin & Gong, 1996)
G. quadrata Zhu, Kim & Song, 1997 = Guizygiella salta (Yin & Gong, 1996)

See also
 List of Tetragnathidae species

References

Araneomorphae genera
Spiders of Asia
Tetragnathidae